Omobranchus elegans is a species of combtooth blenny found in the Northwest Pacific ocean.  This species can reach a length of  TL.

References

elegans
Taxa named by Franz Steindachner
Fish described in 1876